
Gmina Łukta is a rural gmina (administrative district) in Ostróda County, Warmian-Masurian Voivodeship, in northern Poland.

Villages
Gmina Łukta contains the villages and settlements of Białka, Chudy Dwór, Dąg, Dragolice, Florczaki, Ględy, Gucin, Kojdy, Komorowo, Kotkowo, Kozia Góra, Łukta, Lusajny, Markuszewo, Maronie, Molza, Mostkowo, Niedźwiady, Nowaczyzna, Nowe Ramoty, Orlik, Pelnik, Plichta, Pupki, Ramoty, Sarni Dół, Skwary, Sobno, Spórka, Strzałkowo, Swojki, Szeląg, Trokajny, Worliny, Wynki and Zajączkowo.

Neighbouring gminas
Gmina Łukta is bordered by the gminas of Gietrzwałd, Jonkowo, Miłomłyn, Morąg, Ostróda and Świątki.

References
Polish official population figures 2006

Lukta
Ostróda County